Renzo Rossellini (born 24 August 1941), also called Rossellini Jr., is an Italian film producer. He is the second son of costume designer Marcella de Marchis and film director Roberto Rossellini. Since 1964, he has produced 64 films.

From 1977 to 1983 he was President of Gaumont Italy and was instrumental in the modernization of Italian film theaters, introducing multiplex structures. In 1975 he co-founded Radio Città Futura in Rome, one of the first "free"not state-ownedradio stations in Italy. In 1981, one year after the Soviet invasion of Afghanistan, he co-founded Radio Free Kabul. He lives in Rome and Los Angeles.

Learning from his father
In 1958, Renzo Rossellini graduated from the Accademia di Belle Arti di Venezia with a degree in Visual Arts. After graduation, he began working in the film industry, while studying History and Philosophy at the Sorbonne University in Paris, albeit without graduating. In those years, he had a love story with Katherine L. O'Brien. From their relationship, their son Alessandro is born.
 

From 1959 to 1977, Renzo worked with his father Roberto, as assistant director, second unit director and producer. Together, they made a number of movies and TV mini-series, mainly documentaries for Italian state television RAI. He then married Patrizia Mannajuolo, his first wife.

In 1962, he directed a segment of the film Love at Twenty, which gets nominated at  the 12th Berlin International Film Festival.

Il the Sixties, with his San Diego Film Company, he filmed and produced newsreels on the birth of several national liberation movements, ranging from the Algerian National Liberation Front to the Palestinian Liberation Organization, and the Mozambican Liberation Front.
In 1966, while in Cuba, he took part to the foundation of Tricontinental, the organization built by Ernesto "Che" Guevara to promote national liberation's movements in Africa, Asia, and Latin America, in which he represented the Algerian population.

Political Activism and Free Radios 
In the early Seventies he became a member of Avanguardia operaia, an organization of the Italian new left-wing political party. At that time he founded, with director Cesare Zavattini, actor and Nobel Prize winner Dario Fo, and director Mario Monicelli the Italian National Committee against Fascism in the Mediterranean.

During those years, he lived with Chantal Personè: from their union a daughter, Rossa, is born.

In 1975, in Rome, he established — with publisher Giulio Savelli and the support from several Feminist groups, militants of Avanguardia operaia and of Partito di Unità Proletaria per il Comunismo — Radio Città Futura, RCF, one of the major Italian free radios. 
In Italy, from the Fascist Thirties up to the Democratic Seventies, the only radios allowed to exist were those owned by the Government. The movement's radios of Italy set up the Federation of Democratic Italian Radios, or FRED. FRED's members, differentiating themselves from purely commercial radios, introduced the talk radio practice to the Italian audience, bringing to the forefront with interviews and live broadcasts, people and their lives' happenings. Rossellini was subsequently elected President of FRED.

In the general political elections of June 1976, like Italian screenwriter Ugo Pirro, he endorsed the Proletarian Democracy party, a coalition representing the major groups of the Italian new left.

Death of Roberto and birth of Gaumont Italy 
Over Christmas 1976, five months before dying, Roberto Rossellini wrote to his son Renzo a letter, which is both a summary of their relationship and a concise spiritual testament. In the letter,  Roberto apologizes for not having followed his son's inclinations and leaves him the task to protect and promote his audiovisual encyclopaedic project.

In 1977, when his father Roberto passed away, he takes care of the large Rossellini family and becomes President of Gaumont Italy, the newly formed Italian branch of French-based multinational Gaumont Film Company, which he will lead for seven years, until 1983.

In 1978, due to the Aldo Moro Kidnapping, he is accused by the media to have foretold the kidnapping, live on Radio Città Futura, some two hours before it actually happened. Rossellini explained that, on the morning of the kidnapping while reviewing and commenting the press, he just advanced an inductive political hypothesis. He pointed out that, on the day in which the Italian Democratic Christian party was forming a government with the explicit back up of the Italian Communist Party, this new event would most certainly lead to an attack from the Red Brigades.

In January 1979, a neofascist commando from the Nuclei Armati Rivoluzionari, assaults with automatic rifles and guns the headquarters of Radio Città Futura, wounding five women and setting fire to their offices and transmitters. This happened just as Renzo finished reading the morning press news.

During his seven years as president of Gaumont Italy, he produced and distributed more than 100 movies, bringing some freshness to the Italian movie industry.

He produced a few movies with a number of established and distinguished Italian directors like Federico Fellini, Mario Monicelli, Liliana Cavani, Marco Ferreri, Lina Wertmüller, Carlo Lizzani, Francesco Rosi, Michelangelo Antonioni and Marco Bellocchio. He also promotes new younger talents, such as Nanni Moretti. He encourages TV directors to try wide screen movies, as with Gianni Amelio. In 1984, he produced Francesca Comencini's first movie.

Following the example of the French Gaumont, he builds a company encompassing movie industry's three main branches: production, distribution, and theaters. From 1979, with the help of French funds, Rossellini buys a part of ECI (Esercizi Cinematografici Italiani), the Italian State-owned movie theaters company, which was on the verge of bankruptcy.

In 1980, while arguing about a new rise in ticket prices favored by Italian movie distributors, Rossellini proposes instead to increase the number of spectators, through introducing discounted prices for youth and elderly people, to the introduction of multiplex theaters, like in France and the United States. The facts follow the words, although much slower. During Rossellini's leadership of Gaumont Italy, in autumn 1982, the historical Fiamma theatre, in the center of Rome, is split in two screens of 800 and 250 seats respectively. Restructuring of the Odeon theater in Milan, another historical building, into eight screens proves to be much more difficult and lengthy. It begins in 1980 but will complete six years later, three years after Rossellini's resignation as president of Gaumont Italy.

Another noteworthy Rossellini's initiative is the creation of the Gaumont Italy Movie School, a smithery of  directors and producers like Daniele Luchetti, Carlo Carlei,  Antonello Grimaldi, Domenico Procacci.

Radio-free Kabul 
Even while serving as President of Gaumont Italy, Rossellini continues his political activism. In the Summer 1981 a group of French and defected East European intellectuals, comprising Bernard-Henri Lévy, Marek Halter, and Vladimir Bukovsky decides to organize a non-armed operation to oppose the Soviet occupation of Afghanistan. The project of the Paris based group is to help the Afghan partisans to build their radio, Radio Free Kabul, RFK.

Rossellini is the operating arm of the RFK committee. In August 1981, he secretly travelled to Afghanistan, bringing with him three FM transmitters and the experience gained with Radio Città Futura. His reference person in Afghanistan is the partisan commander Ahmad Shah Massoud. When Rossellini leaves Afghanistan, all Resistance groups but one have their united radio, reaching through repeaters the Afghan capital Kabul. Radio programs are in Pashto and in Dari, with a ten minutes prerecorded part in Russian. "The radio you have brought us is worth more than a thousand Kalashnikovs", is the comment of an anonymous partisan commander to French human rights activists.

Radio Free Kabul remains on air for more than two years, being closed at the end of 1983 and followed by two different AM radio station. Nonetheless, the radio survived the fourth, fifth and sixth Soviet Panjshir offensives, with her score of wounded and killed technicians. One of the most popular parts of RFK programs, is a 15-minute letter box, where queries from listeners in Kabul, the resistance-held areas, and the refugee camps in Pakistan are answered.

Some months after the disclosure of Rossellini's role in establishing RFK in Afghanistan, the Italian Red Brigades plan to kidnap Rossellini, for his role as one of the leaders of French multinational Gaumont. Germano Maccari, member of the Roman column of the Red Brigades, will years later tell to Rossellini that he followed him for two months and that the operation was canceled because the manager carried a weapon.

End of Gaumont adventure and bad car incident 
In November 1983, Rossellini resigns as president and general manager of Gaumont Italy. In the previous two years the company had suffered significant losses. Of the fourteen movies produced in the last two years, only a handful has generated revenues. In an interview, Rossellini declares: "I'm the president of a company that, in a year, suffered a dozen failures by promoting a policy of film d'auteur. Of course I feel responsible. Resigning from president was the obvious and right thing to do". Part of the problem comes from the majority shareholder, French Gaumont, which decides to stop financing the Italian experiment, wanting only to retain Gaumont Italy's theater chain or to sell it, to get back her initial investment.

In spring 1984, Rossellini establishes Artisti Associati, a movie production and distribution company, whose major success is co-production and distribution of 9½ Weeks by Adrian Lyne.

On 8 December 1984, a day before leaving for the United States, Rossellini and his wife Elisabetta Caracciolo suffer a terrible car incident. At the outskirts of Rome, the couple's car is pushed by two other cars out of the road and down to a cliff. Rossellini gets multiple femur ruptures. His wife Elisabetta finishes in a coma.

In the following months, Rossellini devotes much of his time to recover himself and to take care of Elisabetta, in Italian, Swiss and American hospitals, where she dies, on 14 April 1985.

Recent activities 
From 1987 to 2000, he takes care, as President of International Affairs, of international marketing for movie production companies, as Phyllis Carlyle Productions, HKM Films, and Shadow Hill Productions.

In Los Angeles, California, Renzo meets and marries, on 7 June 1989, Victoria Kifferstein, who becomes his third wife. Victoria Rossellini is a lawyer and joins 20th Century Fox in 1992. In 2016, she is promoted to Senior Executive Vice President of the company.

In the second millennium, moving between Rome and Los Angeles, he devotes time to teaching: Movie and TV production for Rome's Nuova Università del Cinema e della Televisione; History of European Cinema at UCLA, at Salerno's Fisciano University, and at Naples Federico II University; Cinema History at Cuba's EICTV, and at Santo Domingo University; Movie aesthetics at Montreal's Quebec University.

In 2006 he directs Diritto di sognare, a documentary on Italian Mafia. In 2010 he co-produces Born in U.S.E., directed by Michele Diomà. The movie is dedicated to the 120 years of the movie industry, and features Francesco Rosi, Giuseppe Tornatore and Luis Bacalov.

He is devoting a considerable effort, with the help of Gabriella Boccardo, in maintaining, valorizing and distributing in the new media the memory of his father Roberto and of his works.

Filmography

Producer, co-producer and associate producer

Director 
 Love at Twenty (1962)
 L'età del ferro, TV mini-series, 5 episodes (1965)
 La lotta dell'uomo per la sua sopravvivenza, TV series, 12 episodes (1970)
 The World Population, TV documentary (1974)
 Controsud, supervisor, (2004)

Second Unit Director and Assistant Director 
 General Della Rovere (1959)
 Furore di vivere (1959)
 Era notte a Roma (1960)
 Viva l'Italia (1961)
 Vanina Vanini (1961)
 Ro.Go.Pa.G. (1963)
 Texas, addio (1966)
 La presa del potere da parte di Luigi XIV (1966)
 Idea di un'isola (1967)
 Atti degli apostoli, 5 episodes (1969)
 Da Gerusalemme a Damasco (1970)

Screenwriter 
 L'amore a vent'anni (1962)
 Idea di un'isola (1967)
 Rice University (1971)
 Blaise Pascal (1972)
 Intervista a Salvador Allende: la forza e la ragione (1973)
 Cartesius (1974)
 Concerto per Michelangelo (1977)
 Beaubourg (1977)

Writings 
 In 2002 Luca Sossella ed. publishes Chat Room Roberto Rossellini, a book by Rossellini and Osvaldo Contenti
 In 2007 Liguori Editore publishes Dal neorealismo alla diffusione della conoscenza, by Rossellini and Pasquale Faccio
 In 2007 Donzelli Editore publishes Impariamo a conoscere il mondo mussulmano, By Rossellini

References

External links

1941 births
Living people
Italian film producers
Italian screenwriters
Italian male screenwriters
Italian film directors
Writers from Rome
Renzo